Melvin Monroe Stewart Jr. (born November 18, 1968) is an American swimming promoter, former competition swimmer and world record-holder who won two gold medals and one bronze medal at the 1992 Summer Olympics in Barcelona, Spain. He is the co-founder and publisher of the swimming news website, SwimSwam, and a producer-director of commercials through his company, Gold Medal Media.

Early life and education
Stewart was born in Gastonia, North Carolina and raised in Fort Mill, South Carolina.
 He began swimming competitively at the Johnston Memorial YMCA in Charlotte, North Carolina.

He attended Fort Mill High School until partway through his junior year at the school. That year, he switched high schools to Mercersburg Academy in Mercersburg, Pennsylvania after a sponsor paid Stewart's tuition expenses.

Collegiately, he competed for the University of Tennessee.

Career
At the 1988 Summer Olympics in Seoul, South Korea, Stewart placed fifth in the men's 200-meter butterfly with a time of 1:59.19. The 1988 Olympics were the first Olympic Games Stewart competed in, qualifying for the event when he was 20 years old.

Following Seoul, Stewart began dominating the event. At the 1987, 1989, and 1991 Pan Pacific Swimming Championships Stewart won gold in the 200-meter butterfly. At the 1991 World Championships in Perth, Stewart won gold in the 200-meter butterfly, and set the world record with a time of 1:55.69.

At the 1992 Summer Olympics in Barcelona, Spain, Stewart won the 200-meter butterfly in an Olympic record time of 1:56.26. Stewart also won gold in the 4×100-meter medley relay by swimming in the prelims, and a bronze in the 4×200-meter freestyle relay.

When Stewart did not qualify for the 1996 Summer Olympics at the US Olympic Trials, he still attended the Olympic Games, this time as an analyst for ABC instead of as a swimmer. After the 1996 Summer Olympics, Stewart hosted a season of a television show titled "American Outback" on ESPN. He spent the next decade doing contract work writing screenplays.

In 2006, Stewart joined a team launching a new swimming news website through USA Swimming named SwimNetwork.com. His focus was bringing people to the website and managing the flow of traffic for the website.

Two years later, he began serving an ambassador to the United States Swimming Foundation, where one of his focuses since 2008 has been managing alumni of the US national team.

By 2010, Stewart was blogging and hosting an interview show. Not long after, USA Swimming shut SwimNetwork.com down, and Stewart started a new joint venture of his own.

In 2011, Stewart and a team of co-founders, including his wife Tiffany, Braden Keith, Gary Hall Jr., Garrett McCaffrey, and Rich Roll, founded the swimming news website SwimSwam. The website was launched on March 7, 2012, and a print magazine followed in 2016.

Personal
Stewart and his wife Tiffany moved to Austin, Texas in 2009. Previously, they had been living in California. SwimSwam was headquartered in Austin in part because Stewart and his wife lived there.

See also

 List of Olympic medalists in swimming (men)
 List of University of Tennessee people
 List of World Aquatics Championships medalists in swimming (men)
 World record progression 200 metres butterfly

References

External links

 
 
 

1968 births
Living people
American male butterfly swimmers
American male freestyle swimmers
World record setters in swimming
Mercersburg Academy alumni
Olympic bronze medalists for the United States in swimming
Olympic gold medalists for the United States in swimming
People from Gastonia, North Carolina
Swimmers at the 1988 Summer Olympics
Swimmers at the 1992 Summer Olympics
Tennessee Volunteers men's swimmers
World Aquatics Championships medalists in swimming
Medalists at the 1992 Summer Olympics
Goodwill Games medalists in swimming
Competitors at the 1986 Goodwill Games
Competitors at the 1990 Goodwill Games
Competitors at the 1994 Goodwill Games
20th-century American people
21st-century American people